Adam Mayor (born 10 April 2004) is an English professional footballer who plays as a forward for  club Morecambe.

Career
Born in Liverpool, Mayor spent time with Preston North End before joining Morecambe. He made his first-team debut on 27 August 2022, coming on as an 89th-minute substitute for Arthur Gnahoua in a 4–0 defeat to Milton Keynes Dons at the Globe Arena. Three days later, he played in an EFL Trophy group stage game with Everton U23, where he converted his penalty kick in the 7–6 shoot-out victory following a 3–3 draw. He scored his first career goal in the competition on 18 October, in a 2–1 defeat at Harrogate Town; Mayor said that "the ball came across and it happened quickly, I think Arthur [Gnahoua] missed the ball and then it just bounced to me perfectly to hit it first time". His first goal in EFL League One came on 29 October, in a 1–1 draw at Wycombe Wanderers.

Career statistics

References

2005 births
Living people
Footballers from Liverpool
English footballers
Association football forwards
Preston North End F.C. players
Morecambe F.C. players
English Football League players